Bernardino de la Trinidad González Rivadavia (May 20, 1780 – September 2, 1845) was the first President of Argentina, then called the United Provinces of the Río de la Plata, from February 8, 1826 to June 27, 1827.

He was educated at the Royal College of San Carlos, but left without finishing his studies. During the British Invasions he served as Third Lieutenant of the Galicia Volunteers. He participated in the open Cabildo on May 22, 1810 voting for the deposition of the viceroy. He had a strong influence on the First Triumvirate and shortly after he served as Minister of Government and Foreign Affairs of the Province of Buenos Aires.

Although there was a General Congress intended to draft a constitution, the beginning of the War with Brazil led to the immediate establishment of the office of President of Argentina; with Rivadavia being the first to be named to the post. Argentina's Constitution of 1826 was promulgated later, but was rejected by the provinces. Strongly contested by his political party, Rivadavia resigned and was succeeded by Vicente López y Planes.

Rivadavia retired to Spain, where he died in 1845. His remains were repatriated to Argentina in 1857, receiving honors as Captain General. Today his remains rest in a mausoleum located in Plaza Miserere, adjacent to Rivadavia Avenue, named after him.

Biography

Early life 
Rivadavia was born in Buenos Aires on May 20, 1780, the fourth son of Benito Bernardino González de Rivadavia, a wealthy Spanish lawyer, and his first wife, María Josefa de Jesús Rodríguez de Rivadeneyra. Both parents were born in the Galician town of Monforte de Lemos. Recent studies have also pointed out the Rivadavia family's African ancestry. On December 14, 1809, Bernardino Rivadavia married Juana del Pino y Vera Mujica, daughter of the viceroy of the Río de la Plata, Joaquín del Pino and his second wife, the vicereine Rafaela Francisca de Vera Mujica y López Pintado. His military appointment was rejected by Mariano Moreno.

Career 
Rivadavia was active in both the Argentine resistance to the British invasion of 1806 and in the May Revolution movement for Argentine Independence in 1810. In 1811, Rivadavia became the dominant member of the governing triumvirate as Secretary of the Treasury and Secretary of War. Until its fall in October 1812, this government focused on creating a strong central government, moderating relations with Spain, and organizing an army.

By 1814 the Spanish King Ferdinand VII had returned to the throne and started the Absolutist Restoration, which had grave consequences for the governments in the Americas. Manuel Belgrano and Rivadavia were sent to Europe to seek support for the United Provinces from both Spain and Britain. They sought to promote the crowning of Francisco de Paula, son of Charles IV of Spain, as regent of the United Provinces, but in the end he refused to act against the interests of the King of Spain. The diplomatic mission was a failure, both in Spain and in Britain. He visited France as well, and returned to Buenos Aires in 1821, at their friends' request.

During his stay in Britain, Rivadavia saw the growing development of the Industrial Revolution, and the rise of Romanticism. He sought to promote a similar development in Buenos Aires, and invited many people to move to the city. He convinced Aimé Bonpland to visit the country, but few other invitations were accepted.

In June 1821, he was named minister of government to Buenos Aires by governor Martín Rodríguez. Over the next five years, he exerted a strong influence, and focused heavily on improving the city of Buenos Aires, often at the expense of greater Argentina. To make the former look more European, Rivadavia constructed large avenues, schools, paved and lighted streets. He founded the University of Buenos Aires, as well as the Theatre, Geology, and Medicine Academies and the continent's first museum of natural science.

He persuaded the legislature to authorize a one-million pound loan for public works that were never undertaken. The provincial bonds were sold in London through the Baring Brothers Bank, local and Buenos Aires-based British traders also acting as financial intermediaries. The borrowed money was in turn lent to these businessmen, who never repaid it. Of the original million pounds the Buenos Aires government received only £552,700. The province's foreign debt was transferred to the nation in 1825, its final repayment being made in 1904.

A strong supporter of a powerful, centralized government in Argentina, Rivadavia often faced violent resistance from the opposition federalists. In 1826, Rivadavia was elected the first President of Argentina.  During his term he founded many museums, and expanded the national library.

Presidency
His government had many problems, primarily an ongoing war with Brazil over territory in modern Uruguay and resistance from provincial authorities. Faced with the rising power of the Federalist Party and with several provinces in open revolt, Rivadavia submitted his resignation on June 27, 1827. He was succeeded by Vicente López y Planes. At first he returned to private life, but fled to exile in Europe in 1829.

Rivadavia returned to Argentina in 1834 to confront his political enemies, but was immediately sentenced again to exile. He went first to Brazil and then to Spain, where he died on September 2, 1845. He asked that his body would never be brought back to Buenos Aires. However, his remains were repatriated to Argentina in 1857, receiving honors from Captain General. At present they rest in a mausoleum located in the Plaza Miserere, in Buenos Aires, adjacent to Rivadavia Avenue, named in their honor.

Legacy

Rivadavia is recognized as the first president of Argentina, even though his rule was accepted only in Buenos Aires, he did not complete a full mandate, there was no constitution for more than half of his rule, and did not start a presidential succession line. The chair of the President of Argentina is known as the "chair of Rivadavia", but only metaphorically: Rivadavia took everything when he left office, including the chair, which could never be retrieved.

Liberal historians praise Rivadavia as a great historical man, for his work improving education, culture and separation of church and state. Revisionist authors condemn his Anglophilia, the weak customs barriers that allowed the entry of big British imports, harming the weak Argentine economy of the time, and the Baring Brothers loan that started the Argentine external debt.

Bibliography

References

External links

 Biography at El Historiador 

1780 births
1845 deaths
Presidents of Argentina
Foreign ministers of Argentina
People of the Cisplatine War
People of the Argentine War of Independence
People from Buenos Aires
Argentine people of Spanish descent
Argentine people of African descent
Argentine monarchists
Unitarianists (Argentina)